"A Matter of Traces" is a  science fiction short story  by American writer Frank Herbert, first appeared in Fantastic Universe magazine in November 1958 and later in Herbert's 1985 short story collection Eye.  It is  the first story in Herbert's ConSentiency universe, one of his three elaborate fictional universes spanning multiple volumes (the others being the Duniverse, and the Pandora Sequence developed with co-author Bill Ransom).

Plot
This story takes place in the distant future on the planet Aspidiske VII. A meeting of the "Special Subcommittee on Intergalactic Culture" is called to investigate the possibility of excessive wastefulness on the part of the "Historical Preservation Teams of the Bureau of Cultural Affairs". Secretary Hablar comes to present a sample of the work being done by the Historical Preservation Team. The sample he submits is an interview with one of the few surviving pioneers of the planet Gomeisa III. He is an old man named Hilmot Gustin. When the interview is finished the meeting is adjourned until the following day.

Characters
Senator Jorj C. Zolam – chairman of the subcommittee
Senator Arden B Pingle – from Proxistu I
Mergis Wl Ledder – counsel to the subcommittee
Jorj X. McKie – saboteur extraordinary
Glibbis Hablar – Secretary of Fusion
Interviewer Simsu Yaggata
Mr. Presby Kilkau
Mrs. Kilkau – Gustin's niece
Hilmot Gustin – pioneer

Jorj X. McKie
Although there is not explicit reference to the Bureau of Sabotage in this story, Jorj X. McKie appears for the first time in his capacity as saboteur extraordinary.  In an effort to keep the meeting from going on too long McKie sabotaged Secretary Hablar's projector and arranged to have the Assistant Secretary for Cultural Affairs sent to another meeting so that he would be unable to testify.

Related works
"A Matter of Traces" was followed in 1964 by Herbert's short story "The Tactful Saboteur", in 1970 by his short novel Whipping Star and in 1977 by his full-length novel The Dosadi Experiment.  While none of these works are exactly sequels they take place in the same imaginary universe and share the character, Jorj X. McKie.

Sources
 Herbert, Frank. "A Matter of Traces" (short story) Fantastic Universe, 1958
 Herbert, Frank. "The Tactful Saboteur" (short story) Galaxy Science Fiction, 1964
 Herbert, Frank. Whipping Star (novel) G. P. Putnam's Sons, 1970
 Herbert, Frank. The Dosadi Experiment (novel) G. P. Putnam's Sons, 1977

External links 
 
 "A Matter of Traces" at the Internet Archive

1958 short stories
Short stories by Frank Herbert
ConSentiency universe
Works originally published in Fantastic Universe
Extraterrestrial life in popular culture